The Vinaya (Pali & Sanskrit: विनय) is the division of the Buddhist canon (Tripitaka) containing the rules and procedures that govern the Buddhist Sangha (community of like-minded sramanas). Three parallel Vinaya traditions remain in use by modern sanghas: the Theravada (Sri Lanka & Southeast Asia), Mulasarvastivada (Tibetan Buddhism and the Himalayan region) and Dharmaguptaka (East Asian Buddhism). In addition to these Vinaya traditions, Vinaya texts of several extinct schools of Indian Buddhism are preserved in the Tibetan and East Asian canons, including those of the Kāśyapīya, the Mahāsāṃghika, the Mahīśāsaka, and  the Sarvāstivāda

The word Vinaya is derived from a Sanskrit verb that can mean to lead, take away, train, tame, or guide, or alternately to educate or teach. It is often translated as 'discipline', with Dhamma-vinaya, 'doctrine and discipline', used by the Buddha to refer to his complete teachings, suggesting its integral role in Buddhist practice.

Origins
According to an origin story prefaced to the Theravada Bhikkhu Suttavibhanga, in the early years of the Buddha's teaching the sangha lived together in harmony with no vinaya, as there was no need, because all of the Buddha's early disciples were highly realized if not fully enlightened. As the sangha expanded, situations arose which the Buddha and the lay community felt were inappropriate for mendicants.

According to Buddhist tradition, the complete Vinaya Piṭaka was recited by Upāli at the First Council shortly after the Buddha's death. All of the known Vinaya texts use the same system of organizing rules and contain the same sections, leading scholars to believe that the fundamental organization of the Vinaya must date from before the separation of schools.

While traditional accounts fix the origins of the Vinaya during the lifetime of the Buddha, all of the existing manuscript traditions are from significantly later- most around the 5th Century CE. While the early Buddhist community seems to have lived primarily as wandering monks who begged for alms, many Vinaya rules in every tradition assumes settled monasticism to be the norm, along with regular collective meals organized by lay donors or funded by monastic wealth. The earliest dates that can be established for most Vinaya texts is their translation into Chinese around the 5th Century CE. The earliest established dates of the Theravada Vinaya stem from the composition of Buddhaghosa's commentaries in the 5th Century, and became known to Western scholarship through 17th and 18th Century manuscripts. The Mulasarvastivada Vinaya was translated into Chinese in the 8th Century and Tibetan in the 9th Century but Sanskrit manuscripts exist from the 5th - 7th Century. Scholarly consensus places the composition of the Mūlasarvāstivāda Vinaya in the early centuries of the first millennium, though all the manuscripts and translations are relatively late.

Overview
The core of the Vinaya is a set of rules known as Patimokkha in Pāli and Prātimokṣa in Sanskrit. This is the shortest portion of every Vinaya, and universally regarded as the earliest. This collection of rules is recited by the gathered Sangha at the new and full moon. Rules are listed in descending order, from the most serious (four rules that entail expulsion), followed by five further categories of more minor offenses. Most traditions include an explicit listing of rules intended for recitation, called Prātimokṣa-sutra, but in the Theravada tradition the Patimokkha rules occur in writing only alongside their exegesis and commentary, the Vibhanga described below. While the Prātimokṣa is preserved independent of the Vibhanga in many traditions, scholars generally do not believe that the rules it contains were observed and enforced without the context provided by an interpretive tradition, even in the early era- many of the exceptions and opinions of the Vibhanga seem to stem from older customs regarding what was and wasn't permissible for wandering ascetics in the Indian tradition.

The second major component of the Vinaya is the Vibhanga or Suttavibhanga, which provides commentary on each of the rules listed in the Prātimokṣa. This typically includes the origin of the rule in a specific incident or dispute, along with variations that indicate related situations covered by the rule, as well as exceptions that account for situations that are not to be regarded as violations of a more general rule.

The third division of the Vinaya is known as the Vinayavastu, Skandhaka, or Khandhaka, meaning 'divisions' or 'chapters'. Each section of these texts deals with a specific aspect of monastic life, containing, for instance, procedures and regulations related to ordination, obtaining and storing medical supplies, and the procurement and distribution of robes. The final segment of this division, the Ksudrakavastu ("Minor division") contains miscellanea that does not belong to other sections, and in some traditions is so large that it is treated as a separate work. Strong agreement between multiple different recensions of the Skandhaka across different traditions and language with respect to the number of chapters (generally 20) and their topics and contents has led scholars to the conclusion that they must stem from a common origin.

Parallel and independent Prātimokṣa rules and Vibhnagas exist in each tradition for bhikkhus and bhikkhunis. The majority of rules for monks and nuns are identical, but the bhikkhuni Prātimokṣa and Vibhanga includes additional rules that are specific to nuns, including the Eight Garudhammas. In the Pali tradition, a specific chapter of the Khandhaka deals with issues pertaining specifically to nuns, and in the Mulasarvastivada tradition devotes most of one of the two volumes of its Ksudrakavastu to issues pertaining to nuns.

Beyond this point, the distinct Vinaya traditions differ in their organization. The Pali Vinaya includes a text known as the Parivāra that contains a question-and-answer format that recapitulates various rules in different groupings, as well as a variety of analyses. The Chinese texts include two sections not found in the Pali tradition, the Niddanas and Matrkas that have counterparts in the Tibetan tradition's Uttaragrantha. Relatively little analysis of these texts have been conducted, but they seem to contain an independent reorganization of the Vinaya rules that may be an earlier strata of texts.

Texts
The Theravada Vinaya is preserved in the Pāli Canon in the Vinaya Piṭaka. The Mūlasarvāstivāda Vinaya is preserved in both the Tibetan Buddhist canon in the Kangyur, in a Chinese edition, and in an incomplete Sanskrit manuscript. Some other complete vinaya texts are preserved in the Chinese Buddhist canon (see: Taishō Tripiṭaka), and these include:
 Mahīśāsaka Vinaya (T. 1421)
 Mahāsāṃghika Vinaya (T. 1425)
 Dharmaguptaka Vinaya (T. 1428)
 Sarvāstivāda Vinaya (T. 1435)
 Mūlasarvāstivāda Vinaya (T. 1442)

Six complete versions are extant. Fragments of the remaining versions survive in various languages. The first three listed below are still in use.

 The Pāli version of the Theravāda school
 Suttavibhaṅga: Pāṭimokkha and commentary
 Mahāvibhaṅga: rules for monks
 Bhikkhunīvibhaṅga: rules for nuns
 Khandhaka: 22 chapters on various topics
 Parivāra: analyses of rules from various points of view
 The Mūlasarvāstivāda Vinaya (Sanskrit; Tibetan: འདུལ་བ་, Wylie: ‘Dul ba) (T. 1442), a translation from the Mūlasarvāstivāda school, extant in both Chinese and Tibetan. This is the version used in the Tibetan tradition. It comprises seven major works and may be divided into four traditional sections.
 Vinayavastu (འདུལ་བ་གཞི་ ‘dul ba gzhi): 17 skandhakas (chapters)
 Vinayavibhaṅga
 Prātimokṣasūtra (སོ་སོར་ཐར་པའི་མདོ་ so sor thar pa‘i mdo): rules for monks
 Vinayavibhaṅga (འདུལ་བ་རྣམ་འབྱེད་ ‘dul ba rnam ‘byed): explanations on rules for monks
 Bhikṣunīprātimokṣasūtra (དགེ་སློང་མའི་སོ་སོར་ཐར་པའི་མདོ་ dge slong ma‘i so sor thar pa‘i mdo): rules for nuns
 Bhikṣunīvinayavibhaṅga (དགེ་སློང་མའི་འདུལ་བ་རྣམ་པར་འབྱེད་པ་ dge slong ma‘i ‘dul ba rnam par ‘byed pa): explanations on rules for nuns
 Vinayakṣudrakavastu (འདུལ་བ་ཕྲན་ཚེགས་ཀྱི་གཞི་ ‘dul ba phran tshegs kyi gzhi): miscellaneous topics
 Vinayottaragrantha (འདུལ་བ་གཞུང་བླ་མ་ ‘ba gzhung bla ma): appendices, including the Upāliparipṛcchā, which corresponds to a chapter of the Parivāra.
 Vinayottaragrantha (འདུལ་བ་གཞུང་དམ་པ་ ‘dul ba gzhung dam pa): a second, more comprehensive version of the above
 The Four Part Vinaya (Sanskrit: Cāturvargīya-vinaya) (T. 1428). This is Chinese translation of the Dharmaguptaka version and is used in the Chinese tradition and its derivatives in Korea, Vietnam and in Japan under the early Kokubunji temple system. In the case of Japan, this was later replaced with ordination based solely on the Bodhisattva Precepts.
 Bhikṣuvibhaṅga: rules for monks
 Bhikṣunīvibhaṅga (明尼戒法): rules for nuns
 Skandhaka (犍度): of which there are 20
 Samyuktavarga
 Vinayaikottara, corresponding to a chapter of the Parivara
 The Ten Recitation Vinaya (Sanskrit: Daśa-bhāṇavāra-vinaya) (T. 1435), a Chinese translation of the Sarvāstivāda version
 Bhikṣuvibhaṅga
 Skandhaka
 Bhikṣunīvibhaṅga
 Ekottaradharma, similar to Vinayaikottara
 Upaliparipriccha
 Ubhayatovinaya
 Samyukta
 Parajikadharma
 Sanghavasesha
 Kusaladhyaya
 The Five Part Vinaya (Sanskrit: Pañcavargika-vinaya) (T. 1421), a Chinese translation of the Mahīśāsaka version
 Bhikṣuvibhaṅga
 Bhikṣunīvibhaṅga
 Skandhaka
 The Mahāsāṃghika-vinaya (T. 1425), a Chinese translation of Mahāsāṃghika version. An English translation of the bhikṣunī discipline is also available.
 Bhikṣuvibhaṅga
 Bhikṣunīvibhaṅga
 Skandhaka

Traditions

Theravada

Buddhism in Myanmar, Cambodia, Laos, Sri Lanka, and Thailand followed the Theravadin Vinaya, which has 227 rules for bhikkhus and 311 for bhikkhunis. As the nun's lineage died out in all areas of the Theravada school, traditionally women's roles as renunciates were limited to taking eight or ten Precepts: see women in Buddhism. Such women appears as maechi in Thai Buddhism, dasa sil mata in Sri Lanka, thilashin in Burma and siladharas at Amaravati Buddhist Monastery in England. More recently, women have been undergoing upasampada as full ordination as bhikkhuni, although this is a highly charged topic within Theravadin communities: see ordination of women in Buddhism

East Asian Buddhism
Buddhists in China, Korea, Taiwan and Vietnam follow the Dharmaguptaka Vinaya (四分律), which has 253 rules for the bhikkhus and 348 rules for the bhikkhunis. Some schools in Japan technically follow this, but many monks there are married, which can be considered a violation of the rules. Other Japanese monks follow the Bodhisattva Precepts  only, which was excerpted from the Mahāyāna version of Brahmajālasutra (梵網經). And the Bodhisattva Precepts contains two parts of precepts: for lay and clergy. According to Chinese Buddhist tradition, one who wants to observe the  Bodhisattva Precepts for clergy, must observe the Ten Precepts and High Ordination [Bhikkhu or Bhikkhunī Precepts] first.

Tibetan Buddhism
Tibetan Buddhists in Tibet, Bhutan, Mongolia, Nepal, Ladakh and other places follow the Mūlasarvāstivāda Vinaya, which has 253 rules for the bhiksus and 364 rules for bhiksunis. In addition to these pratimokṣa rules, there are many supplementary ones.

The full nun's lineage of the Mūlasarvāstivāda Vinaya was never transmitted to Tibet, and traditionally, Tibetan "nuns" were śramaṇerīs or simply took eight or ten Precepts, see ordination of women in Buddhism.

Role in Mahāyāna Buddhism
The Mahāyāna Bodhisattvabhūmi, part of the Yogācārabhūmi Śāstra, regards it an offense for monastics following the Mahāyāna to reject the traditional rules of the Vinaya:

Louis de La Vallée-Poussin wrote that the Mahāyāna relies on traditional full ordination of monastics, and in doing so is "perfectly orthodox" according to the monastic vows and rules of the early Buddhist traditions:

See also
 First Buddhist Council
 Second Buddhist Council
 Schools of Buddhism

References

Bibliography
 Horner, I.B. (1970). The book of discipline Vol. I (Suttavibhaṅga), London Luzac, reprint.
 Horner, I.B. (1957). The book of discipline Vol. II (Suttavibhaṅga), London Luzac.
 Horner, I.B. (1957). The book of discipline Vol. III (Suttavibhaṅga), London Luzac.
 Horner, I.B. (1962). The book of discipline Vol. IV (Mahāvagga), London Luzac. 1. publ., reprint, Oxford: Pali Text Society 1993.
 Horner, I.B. (1963). The book of discipline Vol. V (Cullavagga), London Luzac.
 Horner, I.B. (1966). The book of discipline Vol. VI (Parivāra), London Luzac.
 Ichimura, Shōhei (2006). "The Baizhang Zen monastic regulations", Berkeley, Calif: Numata Center for Buddhist Translation and Research, .
 Jayawickrama, N.A., trans. (1962). Inception of discipline and the Vinaya-Nidana, Sacred books of the Buddhists Vol. XXI, London Luzac. (Buddhagosas Samantapasadika, the Vinaya commentary)
 Pruden, Leo M. (1995). "The essentials of the Vinaya tradition", by Gyōnen, Berkeley, Calif: Numata Center for Buddhist Translation and Research, .
 Rhys Davids, T. W.; Oldenberg, Hermann, trans. (1881–85). Vinaya Texts,  Sacred Books of the East, volumes XIII, XVII & XX, Clarendon/Oxford. Reprint: Motilal Banarsidass, Delhi (Dover, New York) Vol. XIII, Mahavagga I–IV, Vol. XVII, Mahavagga V–X, Kullavagga I–III, Vol. XX, Kullavagga IV–XII

External links

General
 Sects & Sectarianism – The origins of Buddhist Schools
 The Essence of the Vinaya Ocean by Tsongkhapa (1357–1419)

Theravada Vinaya Pitaka
 Translations and context on Theravada Vinaya (Vinaya section on www.accesstoinsight.org)
The book of discipline Vol. I–VI, translated by I.B. Horner
 Translation by Isaline Blew Horner (Scanned Text)
 Pali Canon online: Vinaya Pitaka in English
 Davids, T. W. Rhys, Oldenberg, Hermann (joint tr): Vinaya texts, Oxford, The Clarendon press 1881. Vol.1 Vol.2 Vol.3 Internet Archive (Scanned Text)
 Translation by T. W. Rhys Davids and Hermann Oldenberg (HTML format)

 
Sanskrit words and phrases
Buddhist monasticism
Buddhist ethics
Buddhist law
Pali words and phrases